The men's 110 metres hurdles event at the 2018 African Championships in Athletics was held on 3 and 4 August in Asaba, Nigeria.

Medalists

Results

Heats
Qualification: First 3 of each heat (Q) and the next 2 fastest (q) qualified for the final.

Wind:Heat 1: ? m/s, Heat 2: ? m/s

Final
Wind: -0.9 m/s

References

2018 African Championships in Athletics
Sprint hurdles at the African Championships in Athletics